Marcello Ruta is an Italian paleontologist.

Ruta's research primarily has focused on the anatomy and evolutionary significance of Paleozoic tetrapods.

Selected publications 

Ruta, M., Coates, M. I. and Quicke, D. L. J. 2003. Early tetrapod relationships revisited. Biological Reviews 78: 251-345.
Ruta, M., Jeffery, J. E. and Coates, M. I. 2003. A supertree of early tetrapods. Proceedings of the Royal Society of London Series B-Biological Sciences 270: 2507-2516.
Ruta, M. and Coates, M. I. 2007. Dates, nodes and character conflict: Addressing the lissamphibian origin problem. Journal of Systematic Palaeontology 5: 67-122.
Ruta, M., Pisani, D., Lloyd, G. T. and Benton, M. J. 2007. A supertree of Temnospondyli: cladogenetic patterns in the most species-rich group of early tetrapods. Proceedings of the Royal Society B-Biological Sciences 274: 3087-3095.

References

Italian paleontologists
Academics of the University of Bristol
Year of birth missing (living people)
Living people